Grant Green is an American politician who has served as the Oklahoma Senate member from the 28th district since November 16, 2022.

Oklahoma Senate
Green ran in for the Oklahoma Senate in 2022 to succeed retiring Senator Zack Taylor in the 28th district. He faced a six candidate primary including himself, Jeff McCommas, Jamey Mullin, Tony Wilson, Karen Rackley and Robert Trimble. He advanced to a runoff with Jeff McCommas. During the runoff he campaigned on “protect[ing] rural Oklahoma from the urban woke mob” and his campaign was criticized by his opponent for accepting $12,250 in donations from political action committees. He won the primary and general elections and was sworn in on November 16, 2022.

References

21st-century American politicians
Living people
Republican Party Oklahoma state senators
Year of birth missing (living people)